Thomas Parish McKay (28 July 1900 – 3 April 1978) was a Canadian middle-distance runner. He competed in the men's 800 metres at the 1924 Summer Olympics.

References

External links
 

1900 births
1978 deaths
Athletes (track and field) at the 1924 Summer Olympics
Canadian male middle-distance runners
Olympic track and field athletes of Canada
Place of birth missing